Denmark competed at the 2012 Summer Olympics in London, from 27 July to 12 August 2012. The National Olympic Committee and Sports Confederation of Denmark sent the nation's second largest delegation to the Games after the 1996 Summer Olympics in Atlanta. A total of 113 athletes, 63 men and 50 women, competed in 17 sports, although two additional athletes played as team reserves. Handball was the only team-based sport in which Denmark was represented in at these Olympic games.

The Danish team included several past Olympic champions, one of them defending (the men's lightweight coxless fours team, led by veteran rowers Eskild Ebbesen and Morten Jørgensen). Notable athletes included tennis player Caroline Wozniacki, and swimmer Lotte Friis, who won a bronze medal in Beijing. Kim Wraae Knudsen, silver medalist in the men's sprint kayak doubles in Beijing, was the nation's flag bearer at the opening ceremony.

Team Danmark and the Danish Sports' Union (Dansk Idræts-Forbund, DIF) set a goal of eight medals. Team Danmark and DIF also believed Denmark had the best chances of winning a medal in wrestling, shooting, cycling, handball, the equestrian events, rowing, athletics, badminton and sailing. At the end of the Games, Denmark had reached beyond the medal target by a single point.

Denmark left London with a total of 9 medals (2 gold, 4 silver, and 3 bronze), this being considered its most successful Olympics in 64 years. The gold medals were won by rowers Rasmus Quist Hansen and Mads Rasmussen in the men's lightweight double sculls, and track cyclist Lasse Norman Hansen in the first ever men's omnium. Other medals were awarded to the team in sailing, shooting, badminton, and women's rowing. Several Danish athletes narrowly missed out on the medal standings in their sporting events, including two competitors in the Greco-Roman wrestling.

Medalists

| width="78%" align="left" valign="top" |

| width="22%" align="left" valign="top" |

Competitors

| width=78% align=left valign=top |
The following is the list of number of competitors participating in the Games:

| width=22% align=left valign=top |

Archery

Three Danish individual quota places as well as a team quota place were secured at the 2011 World Archery Championships on 6 June 2011, as the Danish team, consisting of Carina Christiansen, Maja Jager and Louise Laursen, finished 8th in the women's recurve event. The same three archers were selected for participation by the NOC on 14 May 2012.

Athletics

Danish athletes have so far achieved qualifying standards in the following athletics events (up to a maximum of 3 athletes in each event at the 'A' Standard, and 1 at the 'B' Standard):

Key
 Note – Ranks given for track events are within the athlete's heat only
 Q = Qualified for the next round
 q = Qualified for the next round as a fastest loser or, in field events, by position without achieving the qualifying target
 NR = National record
 N/A = Round not applicable for the event
 Bye = Athlete not required to compete in round

Men
Track & road events

Field events

Women
Track & road events

Field events

Badminton

The BWF World Ranking of 1 May 2012 was used for the qualifying for the badminton tournament. This gave Denmark the following quota places: 2 in men's singles, 1 in men's doubles, 1 in women's singles, 1 in women's doubles and 2 in mixed doubles. Nine players were selected on 14 May 2012.

Men

Women

Mixed

Boxing

Denmark qualified in the following event with one qualifier.

Men

Canoeing

Sprint
Denmark has qualified boats for the following events in the sprint discipline of the canoeing sport. No Danish canoeists competed in the slalom discipline.

Cycling

Denmark has qualified cyclists in all 4 disciplines in the cycling sport.

Road

Track
Pursuit

Omnium

Mountain biking

Annika Langvad has withdrawn from the Olympics due to broken ribs.

BMX

Equestrian

Dressage
Denmark has qualified one team and three individual quota places to the dressage discipline in the Equestrian sport after finishing in sixth place at the 2011 European Dressage Championship. No Danish riders compete in the two other disciplines.

Gymnastics

Trampoline
Denmark qualified one male athlete in trampolining. No Danish gymnasts competed in the other two disciplines of the gymnastics sport.

Handball

The men's team qualified for the Olympics by winning the 2012 European Men's Handball Championship. The women's team qualified through the World Qualification Tournament. This was the first ever Olympics where both the Danish men's and women's handball teams were present. The men's squad was announced on 29 May 2012 with the reserve determined one month later,  and the women's squad was announced on 2 July 2012.

Men's tournament

Team roster

Group play

Quarter-final

Women's tournament

Team roster

Group play

Rowing

Denmark has qualified boats for the following events

Men

Women

Qualification Legend: FA=Final A (medal); FB=Final B (non-medal); FC=Final C (non-medal); FD=Final D (non-medal); FE=Final E (non-medal); FF=Final F (non-medal); SA/B=Semifinals A/B; SC/D=Semifinals C/D; SE/F=Semifinals E/F; QF=Quarterfinals; R=Repechage

Sailing

Each NOC could only enter one boat at each event, and Denmark qualified to enter a boat in eight out of the ten events only missing Women's RS-X and Men's 470. Which means that Danish sailors competed in all eight Olympic boat types.

Men

Women

Match racing

The Danish boat originally lost their eleventh round robin race by seven seconds, but following a protest the result was annulled and the race resailed.

Open

Shooting

Denmark have qualified for five places is shooting events; athletes in brackets secured the quota place.

Men

Women

Swimming

Danish swimmers achieved qualifying standards in the following events before the games started (up to a maximum of two swimmers in each event at the Olympic Qualifying Time (OQT), and potentially one at the Olympic Selection Time (OST)): Pál Joensen competed under the Danish flag, although he originally played for the Faroe Islands.

Men

Women

Table tennis

Three Danish athletes qualified for the table tennis event. In the men's singles, Michael Maze qualified by virtue of his ranking, while Allan Bentsen qualified through the final qualification tournament. Mie Skov qualified for the women's singles event after her performance at the European qualification tournament.

Men

Tennis

Triathlon

Denmark has qualified the following athletes.

Wrestling

Denmark has qualified in the following events.

Key
  – Victory by Fall.
  – Decision by Points – the loser with technical points.
  – Decision by Points – the loser without technical points.

Men's Greco-Roman

References

External links

DIF.dk 

Summer Olympics
Nations at the 2012 Summer Olympics
2012